Tmesisternus adspersus is a species of longhorn beetles belonging to the family Cerambycidae, subfamily Lamiinae.

Distribution
This species can be found in Papua New Guinea and adjacent islands.

References

adspersus
Beetles described in 1853